This is a list of Denmark international footballers – football players who have played in one to 24 matches for the Denmark national football team.

Key

List of players

1-9 caps

See also
 List of Denmark international footballers, players with 25 caps or more

References

 
Association football player non-biographical articles